Radosław Nijaki (born 25 January 1982), also known as Radek Nijaki, is a Polish former professional tennis player.

Tennis career
A native of Zielona Góra, Nijaki played Davis Cup for Poland and was a two-time national singles champion.

Nijaki made his Davis Cup debut in a 2000 tie against Estonia and partnered with Marcin Matkowski to win the doubles rubber. In 2002 he featured in the main draw of an ATP Tour tournament in Sopot, the Idea Prokom Open, where he had to retire hurt during his first round match against Paul-Henri Mathieu with an elbow injury. He returned to the Davis Cup team in 2003 for his second and final tie, against Monaco at home in Gdynia. Again partnering Matkowski to a doubles win, he played as well in the reverse singles, beating Guillaume Couillard.

Outside of professional tennis he also played at collegiate level in the United States for Texas Tech University. He was initially with Texas Tech in 2002, before leaving to turn professional, but returned in 2005 and in his sophomore season was named Big 12 Newcomer of the Year. At the 2005 Summer Universiade in İzmir he was a bronze medalist in the doubles event, partnering Filip Urban.

See also
List of Poland Davis Cup team representatives

References

External links
 
 
 

1982 births
Living people
Polish male tennis players
Texas Tech Red Raiders athletes
Medalists at the 2005 Summer Universiade
Universiade bronze medalists for Poland
Universiade medalists in tennis
People from Zielona Góra
College men's tennis players in the United States